Tillandsia subg. Anoplophytum is a subgenus of the genus Tillandsia.

Species
Species accepted by Encyclopedia of Bromeliads as of October 2022:

Tillandsia aeranthos 
Tillandsia albertiana 
Tillandsia araujei 
Tillandsia bella 
Tillandsia bergeri 
Tillandsia bismarckii 
Tillandsia brachyphylla 
Tillandsia burle-marxii 
Tillandsia carminea 
Tillandsia castelensis 
Tillandsia catimbauensis 
Tillandsia chapeuensis 
Tillandsia chasmophyta 
Tillandsia eltoniana 
Tillandsia ertonii 
Tillandsia esseriana 
Tillandsia gardneri 
Tillandsia geissei 
Tillandsia geminiflora 
Tillandsia globosa 
Tillandsia grazielae 
Tillandsia guelzii 
Tillandsia gutteana 
Tillandsia hemkeri 
Tillandsia heubergeri 
Tillandsia hofackeri 
Tillandsia horstii 
Tillandsia iassuensis 
Tillandsia itaubensis 
Tillandsia ixioides 
Tillandsia jonesii 
Tillandsia jucunda 
Tillandsia kautskyi 
Tillandsia leonamiana 
Tillandsia leucopetala 
Tillandsia longiscapa 
Tillandsia macbrideana 
Tillandsia mantiqueirae 
Tillandsia milagrensis 
Tillandsia minasgeraisensis 
Tillandsia montana 
Tillandsia nana 
Tillandsia nathanii 
Tillandsia neglecta 
Tillandsia nuptialis 
Tillandsia oliveirae 
Tillandsia organensis 
Tillandsia pampasensis 
Tillandsia paraibensis 
Tillandsia pardoi 
Tillandsia piauiensis 
Tillandsia pohliana 
Tillandsia polzii 
Tillandsia pseudomacbrideana 
Tillandsia pseudomontana 
Tillandsia reclinata 
Tillandsia recurvifolia 
Tillandsia renateehlersiae 
Tillandsia roseiflora 
Tillandsia seideliana 
Tillandsia sprengeliana 
Tillandsia stricta 
Tillandsia sucrei 
Tillandsia tenuifolia 
Tillandsia thiekenii 
Tillandsia toropiensis 
Tillandsia winkleri 
Tillandsia witeckii

References

Plant subgenera
Anoplophytum